The electoral district of Haughton was a Legislative Assembly electorate in the state of Queensland, Australia. It was first created in a redistribution ahead of the 1950 state election, and existed until the 1960 state election.

Haughton was located south of Townsville and incorporated much of the former districts of Mundingburra and Kennedy.

Haughton was abolished in 1960, replaced by Burdekin.

Members for Haughton
The elected members for Haughttn were:

See also
 Electoral districts of Queensland
 Members of the Queensland Legislative Assembly by year
 :Category:Members of the Queensland Legislative Assembly by name

References

Former electoral districts of Queensland
1950 establishments in Australia
1960 disestablishments in Australia
Constituencies established in 1950
Constituencies disestablished in 1960